is a manga by Shohei Harumoto which has been serialized in Shogakukan's Big Comic Superior between 2000 and 2003 over nine volumes. The manga has since been adapted into a live action movie by Toho. Singaporean publisher, Chuang Yi, also translated the manga into both English and Chinese languages under the name "SS: Special Stage" and "SS：赛车手特别篇" (literally "SS: Racer's Special"), respectively.

Plot
The story revolves around Daibutsu, a middle aged former rally driver who used to participate in the All Japan Rally Championship and now lives with his wife Kumiko and their son. Daibutsu goes to his garage to rebuild his Mitsubishi Starion 4WD, named Jackie, a Group B rally car which was banned at the end of the 1986 season. He returns to racing by challenging people on the street with his car.

Location
The street races are set on the Hakone Turnpike road and the Shuto Expressway.

Cast

 Show Aikawa as Daibutsu
 Kenichi Endō as Kurihara
 Noriko Sakai as Kumiko
 Teah as Kabuki
 Megumi as Girako
 Mickey Curtis as Nishiyama President
 Hideo Sakaki as Bunbuku
 Kentaro Nakakura as Yamazaki
 China Fukunaga as Naomi
 Nobuyoshi Kuwano as Takashi
 Aiko Koyatsu as Ana girl
 Mei Satsuki as Ranko
 Mariko Okubo as Natsumi
 Yasuka Saitoh as Akira
 Masashi Miyuki
 Ryohei Yamada
 Ayano Tachibana
 Yuria Kajiki
 Noriyaki Hayashi

See also
Bakusō Kyōdai Let's & Go!!

Sources
Rally JAPAN: Rally cars for movie stars

External links
 Official site
 Movie trailer
 Booklist from official site

Japanese auto racing films
Live-action films based on manga
Manga adapted into films
Motorsports in anime and manga
Seinen manga
2000s Japanese films